Edward Shaw was a 19th-century member of the New Zealand Parliament.

Shaw was originally an English barrister. He worked at Bishop's school in Nelson. From there, he went to the Inangahua area of the Buller District on the West Coast as a resident warden and magistrate in Inangahua Junction, Reefton and Westport.

After retiring in 1884, he later became a district judge.

References

Members of the New Zealand House of Representatives
Year of birth missing
Year of death missing
New Zealand MPs for South Island electorates
19th-century New Zealand politicians